Anomiopus smaragdinus is a species of true dung beetle that can be found in Brazil, French Guiana, Venezuela and Bolivia. It may be a myrmecophile.

References

smaragdinus
Beetles described in 1842